Olle Inganäs (born 1951), is a Swedish Professor of Biomolecular and Organic Electronics at Linköping University, Sweden.

Professor Inganäs received his doctorate in 1984 from Linköping University.

His research interests are in polymer optoelectronics and bioelectronics, conjugated polymer physics and polymer electrochemistry.

Awards
 Member of the Royal Swedish Academy of Sciences, 2006.
 Göran Gustafsson Prize, Royal Swedish Academy of Sciences, 1997.

References

External links
Professor Inganäs's Research group on Biomolecular and Organic Materials
Article in New Scientist about Prof. Inganäs's research on producing the first material in which the fibers themselves act as transistors (published in Nature Materials).

1951 births
Living people
Swedish physicists
Academic staff of Linköping University
Members of the Royal Swedish Academy of Sciences